Tesha is a 1928 British drama film directed by Victor Saville and Edwin Greenwood and starring María Corda, Jameson Thomas and Paul Cavanagh.  The film was originally shot as a silent film but in 1929 sound was added.

Plot
A man's wife has an affair with his best friend and becomes pregnant.

Cast
 María Corda as Tesha
 Jameson Thomas as Robert Dobree
 Paul Cavanagh as Lenane
 Mickey Brantford as Simpson
 Clifford Heatherley as Doctor
 J.J. Espinosa as Dancemaster 
 Boris Ranevsky as Tesha's Father 
 Daisy Campbell as Mrs Dobree

References

Bibliography
 Slide, Anthony. Fifty classic British films, 1932-1982: a pictorial record. Constable and Company, 1985.

External links

1928 films
1928 drama films
1920s pregnancy films
Films directed by Victor Saville
Films directed by Edwin Greenwood
Transitional sound drama films
British drama films
British silent feature films
Films shot at British International Pictures Studios
Films set in England
British black-and-white films
Films produced by Victor Saville
Films with screenplays by Victor Saville
1920s English-language films
1920s British films
Silent drama films
Adultery in films